Tumby Woodside railway station was a station in Tumby Woodside, Lincolnshire on the Kirkstead and Little Steeping Railway which ran between Lincoln and Firsby. The site is now left in an overgrown and unkempt state. The station masters house survives as a private residence. It served the village until closure in 1970 and was immortalised in 1964 in the song "Slow Train" by Flanders and Swann.

References

Disused railway stations in Lincolnshire
Former Great Northern Railway stations
Railway stations in Great Britain opened in 1913
Railway stations in Great Britain closed in 1915
Railway stations in Great Britain opened in 1923
Railway stations in Great Britain closed in 1970
Beeching closures in England
1913 establishments in England